Iglika Passage (‘Protok Iglika’ \'pro-tok i-'gli-ka\) is the passage between the Zed island group and Livingston Island in the South Shetland Islands, Antarctica, 1.53 km wide between Lesidren Island and Williams Point on Varna Peninsula, Livingston Island.

The passage is named after the settlements of Iglika in northern, northeastern and southeastern Bulgaria.

Location
Bulgarian mapping in 2009.

Map
 L.L. Ivanov. Antarctica: Livingston Island and Greenwich, Robert, Snow and Smith Islands. Scale 1:120000 topographic map.  Troyan: Manfred Wörner Foundation, 2009.

References
 Bulgarian Antarctic Gazetteer. Antarctic Place-names Commission. (details in Bulgarian, basic data in English)
 Iglika Passage. SCAR Composite Antarctic Gazetteer

External links
 Iglika Passage. Copernix satellite image

Bodies of water of Livingston Island
Bulgaria and the Antarctic
Straits of the South Shetland Islands